Križ is a small village in the Municipality of Trebnje in eastern Slovenia. It lies in the hills north of Trebnje, just off the regional road leading from Račje Selo to Čatež. The area is part of the historical region of Lower Carniola and is now included in the Southeast Slovenia Statistical Region.

References

External links
Križ at Geopedia

Populated places in the Municipality of Trebnje